Chou may refer to:

 CHOU (AM), a multicultural radio station (1450 AM) in Montreal, Quebec, in Canada, also known as Middle East Radio
 Chou role, the clown role in Chinese opera
 Chou, a fighter hero in Mobile Legends: Bang Bang

Chinese surnames
 Zhou (surname), romanized as Chou¹ in the Wade–Giles system for Mandarin Chinese, a surname among Han Chinese persons
 Cao (surname), a Chinese surname romanized as "Chou" in some Minnan dialects

See also 
 Choux pastry or pâte à choux, a light pastry dough used in many pastries
 Zhou (disambiguation)
 Cho (disambiguation)
 Chūō (disambiguation)